Caderzone Terme (Cadärción or Cadarciùn in local dialect) is a comune (municipality) in Trentino in the northern Italian region Trentino-Alto Adige/Südtirol, located about  west of Trento.

Caderzone borders the following municipalities: Pinzolo, Giustino, Spiazzo, Strembo, Carisolo, Massimeno, and Bocenago.

Twin towns
 Weißbach bei Lofer, Austria
 Sassofeltrio, Italy

See also
Val Rendena

References

Cities and towns in Trentino-Alto Adige/Südtirol